Parliamentary elections were held in Equatorial Guinea on 28 August 1983, the first since 1973. The new constitution approved in a referendum the previous year provided for a 41-seat Chamber of People's Representatives. President Teodoro Obiang Nguema Mbasogo selected a single candidate for each constituency, which were then approved by voters. No political parties took part in the election, with all candidates standing as independents.

Results

References

Equatorial Guinea
Legislative election
Elections in Equatorial Guinea
Single-candidate elections
Non-partisan elections